George Kingston may refer to:

George Strickland Kingston (1807–1880), surveyor, architect and politician in South Australia
George Kingston (meteorologist) (1816–1886), Canadian meteorologist
George Kingston (ice hockey) (born 1939), ice hockey coach and the first coach of the San Jose Sharks
George Kingston (carburetor) (1863–1946), inventor of the carburetor
George Frederick Kingston (1889–1950), Canadian Anglican bishop